Six of the Best is an extended play (EP) by the British rock band Slade, released in 1980. Six of the Best includes six tracks; three new tracks and three taken from the band's 1979 studio album Return to Base. All songs were written by lead vocalist Noddy Holder and bassist Jim Lea, except "I'm a Rocker" which was written by Chuck Berry. The EP was produced by Slade and failed to enter the UK charts.

Background
Having returned to the UK from the United States in August 1976, Slade found themselves out of favour at the time of the UK's Punk rock explosion. The band's 1977 album Whatever Happened to Slade proved a commercial failure while their tour that spring had shown that they could no longer fill large venues. Slade's waning success soon led to the band playing small gigs after that, including universities and clubs. Despite being successful at filling small venues for their live performances, the band's new records were barely selling. After the commercial failure of the band's 1979 album Return to Base, the band's next release would be Six of the Best in May 1980. Alongside the EP, a promotional-only single, "Night Starvation", was released in June to try and gain radio airplay.

Despite having the low selling price of £1.49, the EP failed to chart, with "Night Starvation" failing to generate sufficient airplay. In Belgium, the EP reached No. 3 on the Telemoustique Chart; a weekly rock chart compiled by public votes. The lack of success in the UK continued the band's struggles. In June, the band embarked on a UK tour to promote the EP, but by July were on the verge of disbanding. The band's fortunes changed after they were offered a headlining slot at the Reading festival in August 1980, following a late cancellation by Ozzy Osbourne. The band's performance in front of the 65,000-strong crowd saw Slade back in the public eye. The music press began to take an interest in the band again, while heavy metal followers also began deeming the band 'cool'.

Six of the Best was released on 12" vinyl in the UK only on manager Chas Chandler's label Six Of The Best Records. The A-Side was named the "Rock Side", while the B-Side was named the "Back Side". The EP featured three new songs; "Night Starvation", "When I'm Dancin' I Ain't Fightin'" and "9 to 5". The other three tracks, "I'm A Rocka", "Don't Waste Your Time" and "The Wheels Ain't Coming Down", were taken from Return to Base and were remixed for inclusion on the EP. Lea designed the EP's sleeve.

In a 1980 fan club interview, Holder spoke of the EP and the band's struggles at that time:

Track listing
 "Night Starvation" - 3:08
 "When I'm Dancin' I Ain't Fightin'" - 3:12
 "I'm a Rocker" - 2:47
 "Don't Waste Your Time" - 3:29
 "Wheels Ain't Coming Down" - 3:39
 "Nine to Five" - 2:53

Critical reception
Upon release, Charlie Gillett of Music Week said: "Rasping guitar, spot-on Holder vocals, earthy and commercial, catchy riff. Six cuts, no duffs. Slade are no has-beens."

John Ogden of Wolverhampton Express and Star said:

Chart performance

Personnel
Slade
Noddy Holder - lead vocals, guitar, producer
Dave Hill - lead guitar, backing vocals, producer
Jim Lea - bass, backing vocals, producer
Don Powell - drums, producer

Additional personnel
Dave Garland - engineer
Paul Plant - engineer

References

1980 debut EPs
Slade albums